is a fictional character in the 1994 role-playing video game Final Fantasy VI developed and published by Square, alternatively known as Final Fantasy III from its initial North American release. Shadow is a mysterious assassin and cynical mercenary who joins the player's party along his faithful canine companion,  at various points in the game's narrative.

Both Shadow and his dog were very well received by players and video game publications. Shadow's character arc, which culminates in his heroic self-sacrifice with an outcome that diverges based on the player's choices, has been lauded by some critics as one of the most memorable moments in the history of the Final Fantasy series.

Development
Although Shadow's artwork is supplied by Yoshitaka Amano, his background and story scenarios were mostly designed by Tetsuya Nomura. The character's concept was based on an unused idea Nomura had for Final Fantasy V, which precedes Final Fantasy VI. He had multiple character classes or "jobs" in mind, such as a ninja with a dog and a gambler who fought with dice and cards, which were not implemented for the game. Once work had commenced on VI, Nomura developed Shadow and another party member, Setzer Gabbiani, around these character archetypes. Nomura wrote all of his notes by hand and utilized plenty of drawings for reference. 

Gameplay-wise, Shadow avoids engaging in close combat, instead opting to throw ninja weapons at distance. His special ability "Throw" enables him to throw unequipped weapons that may inflict extremely heavy damage on an enemy. Being a Ninja class character, Shadow has high speed and strength but low defense and average magic statistics. His weapons are various daggers and he can also use specialized throwing weapons to attack multiple enemies. If an enemy hits him with a physical attack, there is a chance that his dog Interceptor will block it, absorbing all or most damage. Interceptor's counterattacks ("Wild Fang" and "Takedown") can inflict powerful non-elemental damage on non-floating enemies. Shadow's "Throw" ability also ties into his character arc, as he had effectively thrown away his loved ones; his withdrawn personality evokes an antihero like the Man with No Name, echoed in the original Japanese script for Final Fantasy VI, where he informs the other characters that he threw away his name.

Shadow's musical identity, like other characters in Final Fantasy VI, is bound up with his narrative journey and alludes to his presentation as a secretive assassin-for-hire. In keeping with the game's approach towards using leitmotifs that contribute towards the depiction of the character in question and to accompany dramatic events which involve them, "Shadow's Theme" (シャドウのテーマ Shadō no Tēma) signifies his narrative purpose; it is a direct homage to Italian composer Ennio Morricone's music for the Sergio Leone Spaghetti Western films starring Clint Eastwood. The game's composer Nobuo Uematsu mashed up elements from the theme songs of the "Dollars Trilogy" movies, A Fistful of Dollars (1964), For a Few Dollars More (1965), and The Good, the Bad and the Ugly (1966), to create a reference that captures Shadow's laconic character. Through his exploitation of a loop of cultural references, as A Fistful of Dollars was an unauthorized adaptation of Akira Kurosawa's Yojimbo which was itself inspired by American Western cinema, Uematsu repurposed musical cues from the aforementioned film's cowboy music for Shadow's theme to convey the notion that the character is an enigmatic and distant mercenary, who is nevertheless capable of heroic deeds. 

Although it is possible to complete Final Fantasy VI without learning any details about Shadow's past, players may uncover information such as hints about a possible familial connection between him and the young girl Relm, provided specific decisions are made and certain conditions are met. The developers later confirmed in a 1995 interview that Shadow is in fact Relm's father. At one point, the developers had considered implementing a cutscene in a bar where Relm's surrogate grandfather Strago Magus asks Shadow to reveal his identity.

Appearances

Final Fantasy VI
During the first half of the game, Shadow operates only on a freelance basis, at times available to the player for a fee and at times appearing in the employ of the Gestahlian Empire. In two instances within the World of Balance, Shadow is forced into the player's party  Crescent Island and the Floating Continent. Shadow's fate is determined entirely by player action on the latter area, and the player will be prompted if they want to jump or wait for Shadow: should the player jump from the World of Balance attempting to escape the Continent's destruction sooner than 00:05 on the clock, Shadow is presumed to have perished during the collapse of the world. However, if the player waits until 00:05 on the clock, Shadow will accompany the party, jump aboard the Blackjack and be available for permanent recruitment in the World of Ruin.

In the second half of the game, Shadow is found injured within the Cave on the Veldt and is returned to Strago's home in Thamasa to heal. Later on, he may be acquired by betting an item he seeks at the Dragon's Neck Coliseum and winning the ensuing match. Whenever Shadow is placed in the party, his backstory is revealed through dreams and nightmare sequences by using a Tent or resting at an Inn. Shadow's actual name is Clyde and he once lived a life of crime with his partner, Baram ("Billy" in the Japanese version). The pair are infamous in the pre-war period before the game begins as a duo of train robbers known as the Shadow Bandits, but Baram eventually suffers mortal wounds during a failed railway heist. Baram tasks Clyde to finish him off, but Clyde instead panics, fleeing his friend. An indeterminate span of time passes, seeing Clyde collapse from exhaustion upon reaching Thamasa, found by a young woman and her dog. It is heavily implied that Clyde fathers Relm with this woman, eventually departing Thamasa under the guise of Shadow to escape his guilt over abandoning Baram.

At the game's conclusion, Shadow remains within the crumbling ruin of Kefka's tower, quietly separating from the party and encouraging Interceptor to flee with the others. His final words are directed to Baram: "It looks like I can finally stop running... Come and find me all right?" (Japanese version: "I don't need to flee anymore. Embrace me warmly"). Interceptor is later seen with Relm in Strago's section of the ending. In Final Fantasy VI Advance it is implied that Shadow remained behind in Kefka's tower as it collapsed, allowing himself to die.

Other appearances
Shadow is featured in the 1995 Nintendo 64 technical demo Final Fantasy VI: The Interactive CG Game. He makes a cameo appearance alongside Interceptor in the 2008 fighting game Dissidia Final Fantasy as a tutor from the in-game manuals. He is an ally and a summonable "Legend" assist character in the 2008 social role-playing mobile game Final Fantasy Airborne Brigade. He also makes minor appearances in the role-playing mobile games Record Keeper (2014) and Brave Exvius (2015), as well as in the collectible card game Final Fantasy Trading Card Game.

Shadow appears as a fully playable character in the spin-off games Pictlogica Final Fantasy and Dissidia Final Fantasy: Opera Omnia. He is voiced by Japanese actor Yoshito Yasuhara in Opera Omnia.

Reception
Shadow had received a positive reception from critics and players. He was voted seventh place in a popularity poll for Final Fantasy series characters organized by V Jump in 1995. In 2020, the character popularity results of an All-Final Fantasy Grand Poll of Japanese players conducted by NHK revealed that Shadow was ranked at number forty one. Shadow has been featured in numerous "top" video game character lists, often highlighting his in-universe role as an assassin or ninja, by multiple publications such GamesRadar, Destructoid, and Complex. 

Shadow's self-sacrifice and potential fate have been lauded by critics as an impactful and memorable moment from the Final Fantasy series. John Teti from The A.V. Club argued that Shadow's death, as opposed to Aerith's from Final Fantasy VII, is the most compelling in the entire series. Calling Shadow one of the most intriguing and entertaining characters in the game's large cast of characters, Teti mourned his loss deeply and remarked that his potential death could only happen as the result of the player's choices or mistakes, whereas he dismissed the significance of Aerith's widely discussed death scene as it happened in the absence of the player's agency. Writing for Destructoid, Chad Concelmo described the drawn out wait for Shadow during the evacuation from the floating continent to be one of the most intense yet fondly remembered moments he had experienced in video games. 

Sebastian Deken observed that unlike other silent cowboy stock characters, who tend to walk off in peace and safety at the end of a confrontation, Shadow opts to face his demons and meet his demise head-on after the defeat of Kefka, which Deken described as "a rare, tragic denouement of clenched-jaw masculinity". He credited the combination of good writing and Uematsu's expertly crafted music, which melts from stoicism to deftly convey "grief, guilt, compassion, and resolve" in quick succession, for turning Shadow's character arc from a well worn trope into something "gut-wrenching and complicated". Concelmo described the opportunity to uncover Shadow's backstory and his history with Relm, which is only available if he survives the events of the Floating Continent, to be "beautiful, touching, and altogether surprising". Concelmo cited his story arc to be a major factor behind why Final Fantasy VI is one of the greatest videogames ever made. Patrick Holleman praised the developers' decision not to oversell Shadow's paternal connection to Relm, as he felt that the game would have suffered had the character provided a "tear-filled admission".

Shadow's dog, Interceptor, is also a popular character and described as one of the highlights of Final Fantasy VI by some sources. Interceptor was awarded first place in the category "Best Goodie" at the Nintendo Power Awards of 1994, which referred to his status as an appealing and popular side character. Concelmo enjoy Interceptor's role in the gradual reveal of Shadow's backstory involving Relm. Nathan Schlothan from RPGamer claimed that few dog characters in role-playing games are "as iconic as Interceptor", the one entity that ties Shadow to his troubled past besides his usefulness in battle.

See also
 Characters of Final Fantasy VI
 Ninja in popular culture

References

Characters designed by Tetsuya Nomura
Fictional assassins in video games
Fictional mercenaries in video games
Fictional professional thieves
Final Fantasy characters
Final Fantasy VI
Male characters in video games
Ninja characters in video games
Video game characters introduced in 1994